Lieutenant General Lê Nguyên Khang (11June 193112November 1996) was a  Marine Commander of the South Vietnamese Republic of Vietnam Marine Corps. Commander of III Corps 9 June 1966. He was awarded the Silver Star for valor June 27 - 29, 1967 by the President of the United States, and was described by General Wallace M. Greene, Jr., CMC USMC, "as one of the finest field commanders in Asia."

Early life 
Khang was born in Sơn Tây, Hanoi, Vietnam on 11 June 1931.

Military career
In 1965 Khang served as commander of the Marines which together with the Airborne formed the South Vietnamese general reserve and had a significant political role to play in Saigon. Khang was allied with Air Vice Marshal Nguyễn Cao Kỳ, while General Dư Quốc Đống commanding the Airborne was an ally of Kỳ's rival General Nguyễn Văn Thiệu. The general reserve troops represented the real muscle of the Saigon-based Directory members and also constituted a balance of power between the rival officer cliques.

In 1972 Thiệu finally moved both Đống and Khang out of their Divisions, transferring Đống to command the Capital Military District and Khang to a nebulous "special assistant" post under General Cao Văn Viên on the Joint General Staff. Of the two, Americans considered Khang the better commander, but his past alliance with Kỳ proved a major liability.

Assignments
Commander of the Marine Corps,
VNN Commander,
Commander of the Capital Military Zone,
Saigon-Gia Dinh Military Governor,
III Corps and III Tactical Zone Commander (1968)
Representative of the Government in the Eastern Regions,
Deputy Chief of the Joint General Staff in Operations.

Death 
According to Republic of Vietnam Marine Corps sources, Lê died in Orange County, Virginia, USA on 12November 1996. However, according to noted Vietnam War historian, Spencer C. Tucker, the place of death was Hope, California.

References

External links
A Eulogy For General Lê Nguyen Khang
Lieutenant General Le Nguyen Khang's resume

1931 births
1996 deaths
People from Hanoi
Army of the Republic of Vietnam generals
South Vietnamese military personnel of the Vietnam War